This article contains information about the literary events and publications of 1512.

Events
unknown dates
Urbatagirk ("The Book of Friday"), the first printed book in the Armenian language, is printed in Venice by Hakob Meghapart.
The concept of the masque is brought to Britain by King Henry VIII of England.

New books

Prose
Desiderius Erasmus – Copia: Foundations of the Abundant Style (De Utraque Verborum ac Rerum Copia)
Henry Medwall – Fulgens and Lucrece
Huldrych Zwingli – De Gestis inter Gallos et Helvetios relatio
Il-yeon – The Samguk Yusa (Korean)

Poetry

Hieronymus Angerianus – Erotopaegnion
Stephen Hawes – The Comfort of Lovers
Thomas Murner
Schelmenzunft (Guild of Rogues)
Narrenbeschwörung (Muster of Fools)

Uncertain date
Syr Degore (written pre-1325)

Births
Thomas Sébillet, French writer on poetry (died 1589)
Unknown dates
Thomas Beccon, English Protestant reformer and writer (died 1567)
Cristóvão Falcão, Portuguese poet (died c. 1557)

Deaths
October 14 – Dietrich Gresemund, German humanist writer (born 1477)
Unknown date – Enveri, Ottoman Turkish historian and poet

References

1512

1512 books
Years of the 16th century in literature